Events in the year 2013 in Namibia.

Incumbents 

 President: Hifikepunye Pohamba
 Prime Minister: Hage Geingob
 Chief Justice of Namibia: Peter Shivute

Events 

 29 November – LAM Mozambique Airlines Flight 470 crashed into the Bwabwata National Park, killing all 27 passengers and 6 crew on board.

Deaths

References 

 
2010s in Namibia
Years of the 21st century in Namibia
Namibia
Namibia